Joy & Inspiration or He Is Beautiful is the twenty first studio album by American country music artist Crystal Gayle. It was released in 1997 via the Beautiful Music Company and Warner Special Products. The album was co-produced by Bobby Wood, Jay Patten, and Gayle. Joy and Inspiration would become her second album consisting of gospel music and would eventually be re-released and re-titled in 2008 under the name "He is Beautiful".

Background and content 
Joy and Inspiration draws on elements taken not only from gospel, but also from country and pop music. Gayle was inspired to record another album of gospel music because it brought back memories of her childhood. She often spent her early years singing inspirational songs with her mother and family. In 1997, Gayle discussed her reasoning behind the development of the recording,
"We never thought we were poor even though we had hard times. Mom always said, 'Keep God in your heart and you will always be the richest folks on Earth.' I draw my inspiration not only from God but from my special family and friends."

Joy & Inspiration originally contained twenty tracks of material. The twelfth track "Someday" had been previously issued on Gayle's 1995 studio album of the same name. The album included cover versions of popular gospel and inspirational songs. This included the tracks "Put Your Hand in the Hand", "One Day at a Time", and "Swing Low, Sweet Chariot". "He Is Beautiful to Me" was originally recorded by Gayle in 1982 for the studio album, True Love. The song was re-recorded for this album.

Critical reception and release 
Joy & Inspiration mainly received positive responses from music critics and journalists. Jim Allen of Allmusic praised Gayle's vocal effects and musical styles, "Crystal Gayle gained pop/country crossover stardom in the '70s with hits like “Don't It Make My Brown Eyes Blue,” but like so many great country artists, she had a strong gospel side to her musical personality. That spiritual side was expressed in the 1997 album HE IS BEAUTIFUL, where Gayle brought her sweet, supple vocal style to a batch of faith-based tunes. The music touches on pop, country, and gospel simultaneously, but the purity of intent is always there."

Joy & Inspiration was first released in 1997 and distributed as an audio cassette. In its initial issue, the album was released by both the Beautiful Music Company and Warner Special Products, a subsidiary of the larger Warner Bros. Records. It was re-issued as a compact disc on September 9, 2008, and was re-titled under the name He Is Beautiful. In this format, the album was released under the Demon Music Group.

Track listing

Personnel 
Credits are adapted from liner notes of Joy & Inspiration.

Musicians

 Children's Choir – harmony vocals
 Michael Black – harmony vocals
 Mark Casstevens – acoustic guitar
 Michael Chapman – bass
 Jim Ferguson – acoustic bass, harmony vocals
 Crystal Gayle – lead vocals, harmony vocals
 Yvonne Hodges – harmony vocals
 Chris Leuzinger – guitar
 Michael Loudermilk – guitars
 Louis Nunley – harmony vocals
 Jay Patten – keyboards, mandolin, saxophones
 Cindy Richardson Walker – harmony vocals
 Lisa Silver – harmony vocals
 Milton Sledge – drums
 Buddy Spicher – fiddle
 Jeffrey Steinberg – keyboards, piano
 Jim White – drums, percussion
 Dennis Wilson – harmony vocals
 Bobby Wood – organ, piano
 Curtis Young – harmony vocals

Technical 
 Crystal Gayle – production
 Randy Leroy – mastering
 Jay Patten – production
 Peter Rynston – mastering
 Steve Tillisch – engineering
 Bobby Wood – production
 Ron Treat – engineering

References 

1997 albums
Crystal Gayle albums
Albums produced by Crystal Gayle
Gospel albums by American artists